Heterudea illustralis is a moth in the family Crambidae. It was described by Paul Dognin in 1905. It is found in Loja Province, Ecuador. It is known to have a short lifespan.

References

Moths described in 1905
Spilomelinae